Ruellia  trachyphylla is a plant native to the Cerrado vegetation of Brazil.

trachyphylla
Flora of Brazil